Elachista indigens is a moth of the family Elachistidae. It is found in the Australian state of New South Wales.

The wingspan is 9.4–10 mm for males. The forewings and hindwings are pale grey.

References

Moths described in 2011
indigens
Moths of Australia